Euphaedra castanoides, or the chestnut orange forester, is a butterfly in the family Nymphalidae. It is found in Nigeria, Cameroon, the Democratic Republic of the Congo and Tanzania. The habitat consists of forests.

The larvae possibly feed on Sapindaceae species.

Subspecies
Euphaedra castanoides castanoides (Cameroon, Democratic Republic of the Congo: Shaba, Tanzania)
Euphaedra castanoides deficiens Hecq, 1997 (Ethiopia)
Euphaedra castanoides gashaka Hecq, 1996 (Nigeria: Mambilla Plateau)

References

Butterflies described in 1985
castanoides